Dhakar is a Hindu small landlord and agricultural peasant caste in the Indian state of Rajasthan and Madhya Pradesh

Dharkat or Dhakar was an important merchant community in Rajasthan mentioned in several inscriptions. They are now extinct in Rajasthan, but survive as a small Jain community in Vidarbha region.

References 

Social groups of Madhya Pradesh
Social groups of Rajasthan
Social groups of Chhattisgarh